Granitsa may refer to the following places:

in Bulgaria:
Granitsa, Bulgaria
in Greece:
Granitsa, Evrytania, a village in Evrytania
Granitsa, Ioannina, a village in the Ioannina regional unit
A former name of Anthofyto village in Aetolia-Acarnania
A former name of Diakopi village in Phocis
A former name of Lafystio village in Boeotia
A former name of Nymfasia village in Arcadia

See also
Stefanos Granitsas (1881–1915), Greek writer
Granica (disambiguation) 
Granice (disambiguation) 
Hranice (disambiguation)